Nancy Maryanne Dow (July 22, 1936 – May 25, 2016)  was an American actress who appeared in a small number of films and television shows. She was married to actor John Aniston with whom she had a daughter, Jennifer Aniston.

Early life
Dow was born in West Hartford, Connecticut, one of six daughters of Louise (née Grieco) and Gordon McLean Dow. Her maternal grandfather, Louis Grieco, was an Italian immigrant; her other ancestry included English, Scottish and  Irish. Dow had five sisters: Linda, Martha, Sally, Joan and Jean.

Career

Dow was an actress, model and author. Dow acted in a few television shows, including  The Beverly Hillbillies, where she played Athena in one episode.

Personal life 
Dow was also married to John T. "Jack" Melick Jr., a pianist-bandleader who was based in Dallas from 1956 to 1961. The couple had one son, John T. Melick III (born 1959), an assistant director and second-unit director.

Dow and her daughter Jennifer were estranged for six years, partially because Dow wrote a book about their relationship, entitled From Mother and Daughter to Friends: A Memoir (1999). In 2005, after Aniston's divorce from Brad Pitt, she and her mother reportedly reconciled. Aniston described the gradual progress of her new relationship with her mother: "It's been really nice. It's crazy what, you know, your life kind of being turned upside down will lead you to. ... For us it's ... It was the time and it was going to happen when it was supposed to happen. So this is good. It's baby steps."

Health and death
In 2011 and 2012, Dow had several strokes, which affected her ability to speak and walk. On the morning of May 25, 2016, she was taken by ambulance from her home in Toluca Lake, Los Angeles. She died two days later at 79 years old.

Filmography
The Beverly Hillbillies (1966) (TV series) – Athena
The Wild Wild West (1967) (TV series) – Tersa
The Ice House (1969) – Jan Wilson
Pure (2004) – Lynne

References

External links

Jennifer Aniston
1936 births
2016 deaths
20th-century American actresses
21st-century American actresses
Actresses from Connecticut
American film actresses
American people of English descent
American people of Irish descent
American people of Italian descent
American people of Scottish descent
American television actresses
People from West Hartford, Connecticut